Edruvera, Texas is a ghost town in Crockett County, Texas.

References

Crockett County, Texas
Ghost towns in Texas